The year 1693 in science and technology involved some significant events.

Actuarial science
 Edmond Halley publishes an article in Philosophical Transactions of the Royal Society on life annuities featuring a life table constructed on the basis of statistics from Breslau provided by Caspar Neumann.

Botany
 Publication of Charles Plumier's first work, Description des plantes de l'Amérique, in Paris, principally devoted to ferns.

Mathematics
 Bernard Frénicle de Bessy's , a treatise on magic squares, is published posthumously, describing all 880 essentially different normal magic squares of order 4.

Physiology and medicine
 Flemish anatomist Philip Verheyen, in his widely used text Corporis Humani Anatomia, is the first to record the name of the Achilles tendon.

Births
 March – James Bradley, Astronomer Royal (died 1762)

Deaths
 February 18 – Elias Tillandz, Swedish physician and botanist in Finland (born 1640)
 October 4 – Sir Thomas Clayton, English physician, academic and politician (born c.1612)
 December 22 – Elisabeth Hevelius, Danzig astronomer (born 1647)

References

 
17th century in science
1690s in science